Kempton Park is a city in the East Rand region of Gauteng province, South Africa. It is part of the City of Ekurhuleni Metropolitan Municipality. It is situated south of Tembisa, one of the largest townships in South Africa, which is also part of Ekurhuleni. South Africa's busiest airport, O. R. Tambo International Airport is located in Kempton Park.

The name of the city is sometimes written as "Kemptonpark" in Afrikaans.

History
Kempton Park lies on what was two Boer farms in the South African Republic (ZAR). The first farm was Zuurfontein No 369 with the title deed issued to Johannes Stephanus Marais on 25 October 1859 and surveyed to be 3000 morgen on 12 December 1859. The second farm northwest of the first was registered to Cornelius Johannes Beukes in March 1865 and was called Rietfontein 32 IR. After the discovery of gold in Johannesburg, 22 km southwest of the farms in 1886, a railway connecting Pretoria to Vereeniging and to the Cape line was constructed in the early 1890s. The railway line did not go through Johannesburg, but passed to the east through the two farms with a station called Zuurfontein. That station would be linked by a side-rail to the Zuid-Afrikaansche Fabrieken voor Ontplofbare Stoffen, a dynamite factory a few kilometres north west.

The city was established on 24 August 1903 when Karl Friedrich Wolff sub-divided a portion of his Zuurfontein farm into 216 residential stands and named the new town Kempten after the German town in Bavaria of his birth. The name was anglicised into Kempton Park. 

O. R. Tambo International Airport (Africa's busiest airport) is located in Kempton Park. In 1952 the airport, then known as Jan Smuts International Airport, was built on land next to the community, and opened in 1953. The airport's name was changed to Johannesburg International Airport in the late 1990s and then to OR Tambo International Airport in 2006. Kempton Park has been part of the City of Ekurhuleni Metropolitan Municipality since the year 2000.

Storming of the Kempton Park World Trade Centre
The storming of Kempton Park World Trade Centre took place on 25 June 1993 when approximately three thousand members of the Afrikaner Volksfront (AVF), Afrikaner Weerstandsbeweging (AWB) and other paramilitary White Nationalist Afrikaner groups stormed the World Trade Centre in Kempton Park. At the time of the attack the World Trade Centre was the venue for multi-party CODESA negotiations to end the apartheid system through the country's first multi-racial elections. These negotiations were strongly opposed by some White groups in South Africa.  The invasion came after other clashes between police and right-wingers, such as the Battle of Ventersdorp, and much belligerent rhetoric from supremacists such as Eugène Terre'Blanche of the AWB.

Geography

Communities
Kempton Park was declared a city in 1992 and has the following suburbs:

Allen Grove
Aston Manor
Birch Acres
Birchleigh
Birchleigh North
Bonaero Park
Bredell
Cresslawn
Croydon
Edleen
Esther Park
Glen Marais
Isando
Kempton Park West
Nimrod Park
Norkem Park
Pomona
Rhodesfield
Spartan
Terenure
Van Riebeeck Park

Tembisa is a large township situated to the north of Kempton Park in Ekurhuleni, Gauteng, South Africa. It was established in 1957 when Africans were resettled from Alexandra and other areas in Edenvale, Kempton Park, Midrand and Germiston.

Demographics
In the census of 2011, the population of Kempton Park consisted of 171,575 people living in 53,777 households. 47% of the people described themselves as "White", 46% as "Black African" and 2% as "Coloured". 35% spoke Afrikaans as their first language and 26% spoke English.

Economy

Spartan is a large industrial zone which houses many chemical manufacturing and other industrial sites. North-west of Kempton Park lies the heavy industry suburb of Modderfontein with one of the main companies there, the AECI Dynamite factory. Kempton Park also has a large coal power station named Kelvin power station which supplies power to the City of Johannesburg. The Emperor's Palace Casino is also located in Kempton Park, just south of the airport.

The international airport plays a dominant role in the local economy. Several airline and other aviation related companies are headquartered in Kempton Park. 
South African Airways, the flag carrier of South Africa, and subsidiary South African Express have their head offices in Kempton Park. Airlink, a regional South African airline, has its headquarters on the grounds of OR Tambo Airport. Mango, a low cost airline, is headquartered on the grounds of OR Tambo. Federal Air has its headquarters on the OR Tambo grounds. 1Time had its head office in the Isando Industrial Park. Safair's head office is in Kempton Park.

Education 
The city has ten major schools:
 Hoërskool Jeugland, Hoërskool Kempton Park, Rhodesfield High School, Hoërskool Birchleigh, Norkem Park High, Sir Pierre van Ryneveld, Shangri-La Academy, Sonrise Christian School, Cresslawn Primary School, and Maranatha Christian School.

Sport and recreation 
The Kempton Park Golf Course, first designed in 1965, in Spartan, is known as the club where Ernie Els learnt how to play golf.

Gautrain 

The suburb of Rhodesfield just south of the city centre has got a station on the Gautrain rail, named the Rhodesfield station.

The O. R. Tambo International Airport has the eastern terminus of the Gautrain rail at the OR Tambo station.

The highspeed Gautrain Rail links the airport as well as Rhodesfield with the Sandton station in the west. This section from OR Tambo to Sandton opened on 08 June 2010, in time for the 2010 FIFA World Cup.

From Sandton, the railway connects either north to Midrand, Centurion and Pretoria or south to Rosebank and Johannesburg.

References

External links

Google Map

 
East Rand
Populated places in Ekurhuleni